Karen Brevard Stewart   (born April 10, 1952, Florida) is an American diplomat who was the United States Ambassador to the Marshall Islands. She was nominated by President Barack Obama to be United States Ambassador to the Marshall Islands on November 5, 2015 was confirmed by the U.S. Senate on May 17, 2016. Stewart also served as United States Ambassador to Belarus from August 14, 2006 to March 12, 2008 and as United States Ambassador to Laos from November 2010 to August 2013.

Early life and education
Stewart is the daughter of Brevard Nisbet Stewart and Selden L. Stewart II.  In 1973 Stewart graduated Phi Beta Kappa from Wellesley College with a BA in astronomy and economics. She then studied astronomy at the University of Virginia.

Career
Stewart joined the Foreign Service in 1977. Her early international assignments have included ones in Thailand, Sri Lanka, Laos and Pakistan. Her domestic assignments have included serving as international relations officer in the State Department's Office of Fisheries Affairs, economic officer in the Office of Energy Consuming Countries, and economic-commercial desk officer in the Office of Israel and Arab-Israeli Affairs.

Stewart earned an MS in national security strategy from the National War College of the National Defense University in 1998.

Stewart was deputy chief of mission in Belarus from 2004 to 2004 and in 2006 President George W. Bush nominated her to be the country's ambassador. However, following U.S. imposed sanctions, President Alexander Lukashenko pressured Stewart to leave the country in 2008. The United States had been a persistent critic of Lukashenko. Belarus has been labeled "Europe's last dictatorship" by some Western journalists, on account of Lukashenko's self-described authoritarian style of government. Lukashenko and other Belarusian officials are also the subject of sanctions imposed by the European Union and the United States for alleged human rights violations off and on since 2006.

In 2010 Stewart became U.S. Ambassador to Laos, where she had held two earlier posts.

When President Barack Obama nominated her to become U.S. Ambassador to the Marshall Islands, Stewart was serving as political adviser to the vice chairman of the Joint Chiefs of Staff and Supreme Allied Commander Transformation, a role she had held since 2013. She arrived in the country on July 16, 2016.

Personal
In addition to English, Stewart speaks Lao, Russian and Thai.

References

External links

|-

|-

1952 births
Living people
Ambassadors of the United States to Belarus
Ambassadors of the United States to Laos
Ambassadors of the United States to the Marshall Islands
National War College alumni
Obama administration personnel
University of Virginia alumni
Wellesley College alumni
United States Foreign Service personnel
American women ambassadors
21st-century American women
21st-century American diplomats